Notable events of 2014 in webcomics.

Events

Naver Corporation globally launched WEBTOON on July 2.
Namco Bandai subsidiary ShiftyLook shut down in March.

Awards
Eisner Awards, "Best Digital Comic" won by Matthew Inman's The Oatmeal.
Harvey Awards, "Best Online Comics Work" won by Mike Norton's Battlepug.
Ignatz Award, "Outstanding Online Comic" won by Evan Dahm's Vattu.
Joe Shuster Awards, "Outstanding Webcomic Creator" won by Jayd Aït-Kaci and Christina Strain (The Fox Sister).
Reuben Awards, "Online Comics"; Short Form won by Ryan Pagelow's Buni, Long Form won by Jeff Smith's Tuki: Save the Humans.
Cartoonist Studio Prize, "Best Web Comic" won by Emily Carroll's Out of Skin.
Aurora Awards, "Best Graphic Novel" won by Peter Chiykowski's Rock, Paper, Cynic.
Hugo Award for Best Graphic Story won by Randall Munroe's "Time".

Webcomics started

 January 1 — Eth's Skin by Sfé R. Monster
 January 6 — Harpy Gee by Brianne Drouhard
 January 31 — Demon by Jason Shiga
 February 12 — unTouchable by massstar
 April 13 — Paradox Space by Andrew Hussie and various others
 May — Pepper&Carrot by David Revoy
 June 15 — Sanitary Panels by Rachita Taneja
 June 30 — New Normal: Class 8 by Youngpaka
 July 1 — Bluechair by Shen
 July 13 — Winter Woods by Cosmos and Van Ji
 August 13 — Tahilalats by Nurfadli Mursyid
 August–December — No Girlfriend Comics by Brandon Sheffield and Dami Lee
 October 19 — Devil's Candy by Clint Bickham and Priscilla Hamby
 September 24 — Feast for a King by Kosmicdream 
 November — The Royal Existentials by Aarthi Parthasarathy
 November 20 — Lookism by Park Tae-joon
 Bastard by Kim Carnby and Hwang Young-chan
 Princess Maison by Aoi Ikebe
 Congqian Youzuo Lingjianshan by Guowang Bixia and Zhuhua and Junxiaomo.
 Witchy by Ariel Ries.

Webcomics ended
 Zap! by Chris Layfield and Pascalle Lepas, 2003 – 2014
 Pictures for Sad Children by Simone Veil, 2007 – 2014
 Brawl in the Family by Matthew Taranto, 2008 – 2014
 Gunshow by KC Green, 2008 – 2014
 Nimona by ND Stevenson, 2012 – 2014

References

 
Webcomics by year